Frederickton may refer to:

 Frederickton, Newfoundland and Labrador, Canada
 Frederickton, New South Wales, Australia

See also 
 Fredericktown (disambiguation)
 Fredericton (disambiguation)